Erich Gehbauer (15 October 1926 - 2014) was a former German footballer and coach. In the 1971/72 season, he won the German amateur championship with the FSV Frankfurt.

Career
Erich Gehbauer began his football career as a midfielder in the youth team of the FV Hofheim. After the end of the Second World War he played in Wormatia Worms.  After a total of 18 assignments with eight goals, he went to the amateur camp, where he played for SV Darmstadt 98, Rot-Weiss Frankfurt, SV Wixhausen and Germania Oberroden until 1964.

See also
Gerhard Aigner

References
 Lorenz Knieriem, Hardy Grüne: Enzyklopädie des deutschen Ligafußballs. Spielerlexikon 1890–1963. Agon Sportverlag. Kassel 2006. .
 Hardy Grüne, Christian Karn: Das große Buch der deutschen Fußballvereine. Agon Sportverlag. Kassel 2009. .
 Hardy Grüne: Legendäre Fußballvereine Hessen. Agon Sportverlag. Kassel 2005. .

External links
 

German footballers
SV Darmstadt 98 players
1926 births
2014 deaths
1. FSV Mainz 05 managers
Association football midfielders
German football managers